"Junior's Farm" is a song written by Paul McCartney (though credited to Paul and Linda McCartney) and performed by Paul McCartney and Wings. It was issued as a non-album single by Apple Records in October 1974; it peaked at No. 3 in the United States and No. 16 in the United Kingdom.

Background 
McCartney composed and recorded "Junior's Farm" along with "Sally G" in July 1974 during a short stay in Tennessee, in a period particularly relaxed for him and no concert tours scheduled in that year. 

Despite its relative international success, neither of these two songs were included on on their subsequent studio album Venus and Mars of 1975. The track only appears in some of the band's greatest hits compilations. "Junior's Farm" was included in the average setlist of the Wings Over the World tour in 1975. , but it was not a song performed live on subsequent tours.

Recording
The song was engineered by Ernie Winfrey at Soundshop Studios in Nashville, Tennessee in 1974. While recording in Nashville, the band stayed at the Lebanon, Tennessee farm of Curly Putman Jr., which accounts for the song's title. Jimmy McCulloch played the guitar solo as his Wings debut.

McCartney said he based the song's lyrical theme on Bob Dylan's Maggie's Farm and that "the idea was to just get a fantasy song about this person Junior." McCartney said that, in contrast to the degree of thought Dylan applied to his song-writing, Junior's Farm "has silly words and basically all it means is, 'Let's get out of the city.' ... As for reading deep meanings into the words, people shouldn't bother, there aren't any."

Release
The single continued McCartney and Wings' worldwide success after the album Band on the Run. It made No. 3 in the US, No. 16 in the UK, and was a hit elsewhere.

Cash Box called it "a very strong disk," saying that "it has that unique McCartney flair that makes all his musical forays such inspired hit records." Record World said that "Vassar Clements fiddle adds a subtle country touch to a straight-out 'Get Back'-type rocker."

The photo for one of the single's picture sleeves featured Wings dressed in costumes corresponding to the song's lyrics (for example, drummer Geoff Britton as a poker dealer and guitarist Denny Laine as an Eskimo). A sea lion, also mentioned in the lyrics, appears in the photo, between Britton and McCartney, a farmer. This photo appeared on the picture sleeve of the single in Spain and in advertisements elsewhere. In the UK and the US, the single was released in a generic Apple Records sleeve.

The music video of "Junior's Farm" shows Paul McCartney playing a Kay electric bass guitar. The single was McCartney's last release on Apple Records before signing a solo recording contract with Capitol Records in May 1975, following the dissolution of the Beatles' partnership.

Subsequent releases
"Junior's Farm" was later released on the McCartney/Wings compilation Wings Greatest in 1978 and the US version of All the Best! in 1987, although it was not on the UK edition of the latter. The three-minute radio edit of the song was included on the 2001 compilation Wingspan: Hits and History. Along with its B-side (the country-flavoured "Sally G"), "Junior's Farm" was remastered for inclusion on the Hear-Music version of Venus and Mars released in November 2014.

Personnel
Paul McCartney – lead and backing vocals, bass guitar
Linda McCartney – keyboards, backing vocal
Denny Laine – rhythm guitar, backing vocal
Jimmy McCulloch – lead guitar
Geoff Britton – drums

Chart performance

Weekly charts

Year-end charts

Cover versions
In 1994, "Junior's Farm" was covered by the Lee Harvey Oswald Band on their album A Taste of Prison.
In 1996, "Junior's Farm" was covered by Galactic Cowboys on their EP Feel the Rage.
In 2014, "Junior's Farm" was covered by Steve Miller for inclusion on the covers album The Art of McCartney.

References

1974 singles
1974 songs
Apple Records singles
Music published by MPL Music Publishing
Paul McCartney songs
Song recordings produced by Paul McCartney
Songs written by Linda McCartney
Songs written by Paul McCartney
Paul McCartney and Wings songs
Songs about Tennessee